Erica Monique Campbell (née, Atkins; born April 29, 1972) is an American urban contemporary gospel, Christian R&B and contemporary R&B singer and songwriter. She started her music career in 1998 with her younger sister, Tina Campbell, as part of the gospel music group, Mary Mary. Her solo music career began in 2013, and has since released two albums with Entertainment One Music, which both charted on the Billboard magazine charts. She won a Grammy Award for Best Gospel Album at the 57th edition of the event. Since May 2016, she has been the host of Get Up! Mornings with Erica Campbell with comedian Griff, currently distributed by Reach Media, the syndication arm of Urban One.

Early life
Campbell was born Erica Monique Atkins, on April 29, 1972, in Inglewood, California, the daughter of Eddie Aaron Atkins Jr. (1948–2013), originally from Merced, California, a pastor and minister, and Thomasina Andrea "Honey" Atkins (née Daniels), who is originally from Stamford, Connecticut. Her paternal grandparents are Eddie Aaron Atkins, Sr. and Lavada Cruthird, and her maternal grandparents are Tommy and Ruth Daniels. She had two older brothers, Andre Lavelle Atkins, who died at six years old from a combination of Down Syndrome, spinal meningitis, and a hole in his heart, while her other brother is living in Arizona, Darrell Antoine Atkins. She has one older sister, Maliea Dionne Atkins, and five younger sisters, Trecina Evette "Tina" Atkins, Delisa Marie "Lisa" or "Wittle Wees" Atkins, Thomasina Andrea "Goo Goo" Atkins, Alana Ellesse "Lainz" or "Luv Luv" Atkins, and Shanta Nena Lavea Atkins.

Music career
Her music career started in 1998, with her younger sister, Tina Campbell, who formed half of the gospel music duo, Mary Mary. As part of Mary Mary, Campbell earned numerous Stellar Music and Dove Awards, four Grammy Awards, three NAACP Image Awards, two American Music Awards, a Soul Train Award and a BET Award. In 2008, Campbell recorded a solo track called "Stand" for the soundtrack to the independent  film A Good Man Is Hard to Find. In 2011, Mary Mary received the ASCAP Golden Note Award for their extraordinary songwriting. Erica commenced her solo music recording career in 2013, by recording her first studio album, Help, that released on March 25, 2014, with Entertainment One Music. This album was her breakthrough release upon the Billboard magazine charts, while it charted on The Billboard 200, Top Gospel Albums, and Independent Albums charts, where it peaked at Nos. 6, 1, and 2, correspondingly. Campbell won a Grammy Award for Best Gospel Album at the 57th edition of the event. The subsequent studio album, Help 2.0, was released on March 31, 2015, from Entertainment One Music. This album charted on the same charts, but at Nos. 120, 1, and 12, respectively.

In early April 2018, Erica and her husband Warryn Campbell are to star in their own reality show on TV One. The show will highlight Erica going back in the studio to record her new album. Also in 2018, Erica and her husband released a music video titled,  "All of My Life".

Personal life
She is married to Warryn Campbell, with whom she resides in Los Angeles, together with their three children, Krista Nicole (born 2004), Warryn III (born 2010), and Zaya Monique (born 2012).

Campbell is an honorary member of Alpha Kappa Alpha Sorority, Inc.; she was initiated on January 15, 2023.

Discography

Studio albums

Singles

References

External links
Official Facebook profile
Official morning show website

1972 births
Living people
African-American songwriters
African-American women singers
African-American Christians
Musicians from Inglewood, California
Songwriters from California
MNRK Music Group artists
Grammy Award winners
American gospel singers
20th-century American singers
Mary Mary
21st-century American women singers
20th-century American women singers
African-American radio personalities